Jack Entratter (February 28, 1914 – March 11, 1971), nicknamed "Mr. Entertainment", was an American business executive. He is best known for management positions at the Copacabana nightclub in New York City in the 1940s and early 1950s, and at the iconic Sands Hotel and Casino in Las Vegas from the early 1950s. He is closely associated with Frank Sinatra and the Rat Pack in the history of Las Vegas, Nevada.

Biography

Born to a Jewish family, Entratter began working in the French Casino in Miami, Florida as a reservation clerk as a teenager. He later worked as a bouncer at the Stork Club in New York City in the 1930s. In 1940, he was appointed as an assistant to Jules Podell at the Copacabana nightclub, and was later general manager of the club.  By 1949, he had a controlling interest in the nightclub, and he was still at the club in July 1952.

Entratter became general manager of the Sands Hotel and Casino in Las Vegas when it opened in December 1952. At the time, it was the most luxurious hotel on the Las Vegas Strip and among the world's best hotels. Entratter made many show business friends during his time as a manager at the Copacabana, where he gained renown for his smoothness in dealing with its performers and patrons.
 He was able to use these connections to sign performers for the Copa Room at the Sands, a nightclub that he built especially for Sinatra. Entratter offered entertainers an additional incentive to perform at the Sands. Headlining stars received "points", or a percentage of ownership in the hotel and casino. Entratter's personally selected "Copa Girls" wore $12,000 worth of costumes on the hotel's opening night. This surpassed the salary of the Copa Room's star, Danny Thomas.

Due to the American Mafia involvement in the development of Las Vegas, Entratter was associated with mobsters such as Meyer Lansky and Hyman Abrams in the financing of the Sands, which he ran with Carl Cohen, who was its entertainment director and vice president. Nancy Sinatra wrote in her 1986 autobiography: "Sands was the place. Jack Entratter, Nick Kelly, Carl Cohen, they were quite a team. They knew what talent to book, what food to serve. They also knew how to be generous, and they weren't afraid to be. There were always free drinks for the gamblers". Entratter was still the manager of the Sands in 1966 when Sinatra's live album, Sinatra at the Sands, was recorded, as during the "Tea Break" Sinatra mentioned that Entratter had told him that many of the hotel suites of the new hotel block being built at the time would be given names to glamorize it, including the Danny Thomas, Red Skelton, Dean Martin and Jerry Lewis suites.

Entratter died in Las Vegas on March 11, 1971, after suffering a brain hemorrhage.

Personal life

Entratter was married to Dorothy James until her death in 1961; they had two daughters, Caryl Entratter Palin and Michelle Entratter Walkoff. His second wife was model and actress Lari Laine (Corinne Cole). He reportedly had a "slightly menacing character with the demeanor of an ex-boxer", yet was "smooth and courtly" to those he liked. Known as "Mr. Entertainment", he did not drink alcohol, gamble or smoke.

Entratter was congregation president of Temple Beth Sholom from 1959 through 1963, and again in 1966. In film, he appeared as himself in Pepe (1960), and served as a technical advisor on Sinatra's 1955 film, The Man with the Golden Arm. He was one of the founders of the Jewish Federation of Las Vegas.

References

Sources

 
 
 
 
 
 
 
 
 
 
 
 
 
 

1914 births
1971 deaths
American business executives
American food industry business executives
American hoteliers
20th-century American Jews
Businesspeople from New York City
Businesspeople from Las Vegas
History of Las Vegas
20th-century American businesspeople
American casino industry businesspeople